Henry Armand Burris Jr. (born June 4, 1975) is a gridiron football coach, former professional quarterback, and a member of the Canadian Football Hall of Fame. He is currently an offensive quality control coach for the Jacksonville Jaguars of the National Football League (NFL) and was formerly an offensive quality control coach for the Chicago Bears. Burris played in the Canadian Football League (CFL) from 1998 to 2016. He won three Grey Cup championships, two with the Calgary Stampeders, in 1998 and 2008, having spent 10 years of his career with them, and one with the Ottawa Redblacks in 2016. He was also a sports broadcaster and football analyst at TSN, appearing as a panel member on the network's CFL on TSN broadcasts.

Burris won the CFL's Most Outstanding Player Award in 2010 and 2015. At the time of his retirement Burris was third in all-time CFL passing yards and passing touchdowns. While playing in the CFL, he was also a member of the Saskatchewan Roughriders and Hamilton Tiger-Cats and spent time in the NFL with the Bears and Green Bay Packers. Prior to his professional career, he played college football with the Temple Owls.

Early years
Burris attended Spiro High School in Spiro, Oklahoma, and won four varsity letters each in football, track, basketball, and baseball. In football, he was named the Oklahoma Offensive Player of the Year as a senior.

Burris attended Temple University and finished with 20 passing records. He left the university ranked second all-time in Big East Conference passing with 7495 yards.

Professional career

Calgary Stampeders
Burris went undrafted in the NFL, and signed a contract with the CFL's Calgary Stampeders in 1997. He spent the 1997 season on the Stampeders' practice roster.

He had his first, limited playing time in 1998 in relief of Jeff Garcia and Dave Dickenson, while dressing for all of the Stampeders' games. In 1999, he received more playing time as Dickenson's backup. He replaced Dickenson in the third week game against the Edmonton Eskimos, leading the Stampeders to a come-from-behind victory. He started the following two games against the Montreal Alouettes and BC Lions, leading the Stampeders to another victory in the former. He was injured in the third quarter of the latter, and spent the rest of the season on the injured reserve with a torn anterior cruciate ligament.

Saskatchewan Roughriders
He moved on to the Saskatchewan Roughriders for his first opportunity to be a full-time starting quarterback. He started the first 16 games of the Roughriders season, throwing for 4,647 yards and 30 touchdowns.

Green Bay Packers
The Green Bay Packers took interest in him after the CFL season ended, and signed him to a contract. Burris began playing in the NFL in 2001, when he spent several weeks as the Packers' third-string quarterback, without playing in a game, before he was released, and then he spent the rest of the season on their practice squad.

Chicago Bears
He was signed by the Chicago Bears in the off-season. In six games for the Bears he completed 18 of 51 passes for 207 yards, with three touchdowns and five interceptions. He received significant playing time only in the last two games of the regular season. He was 8 of 22 for 50 yards and a touchdown against Carolina, fumbling twice, and 7 of 19 for 78 yards and four interceptions against Tampa Bay, for a 10.3 quarterback rating. While his passing was quite poor he showed better than average running ability for a quarterback, finishing the 2002 season with 15 rushes for 104 yards.

Berlin Thunder
The Bears assigned him to NFL Europe's Berlin Thunder in 2003 where he performed respectably. Unhappy with being relegated to Berlin by the Bears, he returned to the CFL and the Roughriders, his former club. He immediately became Nealon Greene's back-up. A knee injury forced him to miss the better part of the season.

Saskatchewan Roughriders
Burris returned to Canada in time for the 2003 CFL season, dressing for 10 games that season. He returned his starting position in 2004, starting in 14 games over the course of the season, and leading the Roughriders to the 2004 Western Final, narrowly missing advancing to the Grey Cup. The Roughriders lost the Western Final in overtime to the favored BC Lions.

Calgary Stampeders

In the off-season Burris rejected the Roughriders' contract offer in order to re-join the Calgary Stampeders. In 2005, he took the Stampeders to the Western Semifinal, where they lost at McMahon Stadium to Ricky Ray and Jason Maas of the Edmonton Eskimos. In 2006, he once again helped the Stampeders advance to the CFL playoffs, hosting their second home playoff game in as many years, but lost in the West Semifinal to his former team, the Roughriders.

In the 2007 playoffs the Stampeders once again faced off against the Roughriders in the Western Semifinal (this time played at Mosaic Stadium in Regina, where the Roughriders were hosting their first home playoff game since 1988). Burris once again lost to his former team in a close 26–24 affair.

In 2008, Burris won his first championship as a starter, leading the Calgary Stampeders to a 22–14 Grey Cup victory, over the host Montreal Alouettes. Burris also captured the title of Grey Cup Most Valuable Player and was a finalist for the league's most outstanding player award.

In 2009, Burris led the Calgary Stampeders to a second-place finish in the Western Conference. Trying to atone for a year in which he could not beat the first place Saskatchewan Roughriders (0–3–1), the Burris led Stampeders could not defeat the Roughriders in the Western Division Final, falling 27–17. This was Burris' third straight play-off loss to the Roughriders.

Burris quarterbacked the Stampeders to a CFL best record of 13–5 in 2010, finishing first in the Western Conference. Looking for revenge against his play-off nemesis, Burris lost to the Roughriders for the fourth time in the post season, 20–16. He won the CFL's Most Outstanding Player award for that season.

Burris's string of professional starts ended at the end of the 2011 season, when Drew Tate replaced him as the starting quarterback for the last three scheduled regular season games. Burris performed short-yardage duties for the team as the back-up quarterback. Burris returned to quarterbacking the Calgary Stampeders in the second half of the Western Conference Semi Finals against the Edmonton Eskimos. Burris was unable to lead a second half comeback throwing only 7 completions in 15 attempts with 0 touchdowns, having to settle for multiple field goals.

Entering the off-season there had been much speculation regarding the future of Burris with the Calgary Stampeders. The Stampeders seemed ready to move on and hand the starting job to Drew Tate while Burris had stated that he did not want to be a backup quarterback. The Calgary Stampeders confirmed on January 3, 2012 that they had traded Burris to the Hamilton Tiger-Cats for quarterback Kevin Glenn and offensive lineman Mark Dewit.

Hamilton Tiger-Cats

In his first season with the Tiger-Cats, Burris had a career year. He threw for 5,367 yards and 43 touchdowns, with a passer rating of 104.4, all career highs. Unfortunately, the Tiger-Cats defense struggled, giving up an average of 32 points per game, which resulted in the team falling to 6–12 and missing the playoffs.

On September 13, 2013, midway through the 2013 CFL season, Burris became the 5th CFL quarterback to throw for 50,000 career passing yards. Burris' 4,925 passing yards was enough to lead the league in passing for the second consecutive year. Burris led the Tiger-Cats into the post-season with a record of 10–8, they defeated the Montreal Alouettes and then the Toronto Argonauts, but ultimately lost to the Saskatchewan Roughriders in the 101st Grey Cup game. Entering the off-season, Burris was set to become a free-agent in February 2014 unless he re-signed with the Tiger-Cats. He expressed his desire to stay with the Ti-Cats, saying, "I want to be back here, we've had a great run. I still feel like I can get it done." However, Burris was released by Hamilton on January 30, 2014, following the signing of Zach Collaros.

Ottawa Redblacks
On February 4, 2014, Burris signed a three-year contract with the Ottawa Redblacks. The 2014 CFL season was Burris' worst season statistically since his 2003 year with the Roughriders. Burris led the inaugural season of the RedBlacks to a 2–16 record. His completion percentage was his lowest since 2009, and only managed to score 11 touchdowns in 18 games, while throwing 14 interceptions. He threw the first passing touchdown in Redblacks history in their first game on July 3, 2014, against the Winnipeg Blue Bombers. He also led the team to their first victory during their first home game of the season on July 18, 2014, against the Toronto Argonauts.

Burris returned as the starter for the 2015 season and was the only quarterback in the league to start all 18 games that year. With the addition of offensive coordinator, Jason Maas, and several key free agent signings, Burris experienced a renaissance season. On October 1, 2015, Burris set a CFL record for completions in a game connecting on 45 passes for a career-high 504 passing yards. On November 7, 2015, Burris became the CFL's record holder for most completions in a season with 481 completions. Additionally, Burris finished the 2015 season as the league leader in passing yards and completion percentage. He led the RedBlacks to a record of 12–6, earning a first round bye in the process. In the Eastern Final, Burris lead the Redblacks over his old team, the Tiger-Cats, personally advancing to the Grey Cup for the second time in three seasons. Prior to the Grey Cup, he was named the CFL's Most Outstanding Player for 2015.

Burris left the 2016 season opening game in the third quarter after injuring the pinky finger on his throwing hand. He was replaced by backup quarterback Trevor Harris who was brought in as a free-agent during the offseason to replace the 41-year old Burris in the event of an injury or diminished performance. Initially it was reported that Burris would miss only one game, however he was quickly transferred to the six-game injured list. After an injury to backup quarterback Harris, Burris returned early from his hand injury to play in Weeks 6 and 7. In a halftime interview during their Week 7 match against the Eskimos Henry Burris sounded off in response to criticism from some of the TSN staff regarding his poor performance in Week 6 and the impressive play by Harris before his injury. He was quoted as saying, "So all the people talking junk out there, you can take that and shove it. All right? That's all I have to say". Following a bye in Week 8 Burris started in Week 9 but was once again unable to lead the Redblacks to victory. Harris returned to the starting lineup from Week 10 through 15 with mixed results. Burris returned to the starting role in Week 17 (the fourth last week of the regular season). Ottawa split their remaining 4 games, winning 2 and losing 2 to finish below .500 with a record of 8-9-1. This was the first time in CFL history that a team with a losing record finished first in their division. Following their first round bye Burris led the Redblacks to an East Division Final victory over the Edmonton Eskimos in a snowstorm, advancing the team to its second consecutive Grey Cup game. In the 104th Grey Cup, Despite suffering a slight knee injury during warmups, Burris passed for 461 yards and 3 touchdowns leading the Redblacks to a 39-33 over time win over the Calgary Stampeders to win the Grey Cup for Ottawa for the first time in 40 years. At the Grey Cup parade two days following the victory Burris was in crutches stating he would likely need surgery to repair his knee which he injured in warm-ups before the Grey Cup game. He also told the 40,000 fans in attendance that he would delay his decision regarding the future of his playing career until January 2017.

On January 19, 2017, it was reported that Burris was leaning towards retirement, citing the desire to spend more time with his wife and help raise their children; while at the same time wanting to play in 2017 to help Ottawa win back-to-back championships at the 105th Grey Cup in Ottawa. On January 24, 2017, he officially announced his retirement at a press conference. He was inducted into the Canadian Football Hall of Fame as a member of the class of 2020.

Career statistics

 Games mean "Dressed For", not "Played In"
 Pro totals include CFL and NFL totals only

Broadcast career
On February 21, 2017, Burris begin his broadcasting career and joined CTV Morning Live Ottawa as one of the show's hosts. After two years, Burris announced he would be leaving CTV Morning Live Ottawa, but would continue to be heard on TSN Radio's TSN 1200. Burris was a football analyst at TSN and a panel member on the network's CFL on TSN broadcasts.

Coaching career

Chicago Bears 
Burris joined the coaching staff of the Chicago Bears for the team's 2020 training camp as part of the Bill Walsh diversity coaching fellowship. Burris remained with the team for the duration of the 2020 season as a seasonal coaching assistant. He was promoted to a full-time position as offensive quality control coach on January 25, 2021.

BC Lions 
On March 15, 2022 Burris joined the BC Lions as an offensive consultant. After only 10 days on the job it was announced that Burris was leaving the Lions to pursue an NFL opportunity.

Personal life
Burris is married to Nicole Burris and they are the parents of two boys: Armand, who plays AAA Hockey in Ottawa, and Barron. He was granted permanent residency in Canada on April 28, 2017, after a long bureaucratic hurdle.

See also
 List of Canadian Football League records (individual)

References

External links

 
 CFL bio
 Ottawa Redblacks bio

1975 births
Living people
African-American players of American football
African-American players of Canadian football
American football quarterbacks
Calgary Stampeders players
Canadian Football League Most Outstanding Player Award winners
Canadian football quarterbacks
Chicago Bears coaches
Chicago Bears players
Green Bay Packers players
Hamilton Tiger-Cats players
Ottawa Redblacks players
People from Spiro, Oklahoma
Players of American football from Oklahoma
Temple Owls football players
Saskatchewan Roughriders players
21st-century African-American sportspeople
20th-century African-American sportspeople
Canadian Football Hall of Fame inductees